The Seal River is a river in Kenai Peninsula Borough in Alaska, United States. It is part of the Pacific Ocean drainage basin, and is a tributary of Cook Inlet.

The river flows east from an unnamed muskeg to Redoubt Bay on Cook Inlet.

See also
List of rivers of Alaska

References

Rivers of Alaska
Rivers of Kenai Peninsula Borough, Alaska